Morottaja is a Finnish surname that may refer to
Matti Morottaja (born 1942), Inari Sámi writer, social activist and politician
Amoc (rapper) (Mikkâl Antti Morottaja, born 1984), Inari Sámi musician, son of Matti
Petter Morottaja (born 1982), Inari Sámi writer, son of Matti

Finnish-language surnames